Immanuelson "Manny" Duku (born 28 December 1992) is a Dutch professional footballer who currently plays as a forward for York City.

Club career
Born in Amsterdam, Duku started his career with Legmeervogels. He was on trial with the reserve team of Eredivisie side Heerenveen at the age of 18 in 2011, before enjoying spells in the lower leagues with Legmeervogels, Abcoude, Breukelen and VV Eemdijk. Eligible to represent Ghana at international level, Duku left for England to join Oxford City on a trial basis in 2015, despite not playing a minute of football for his new club, VV Eemdijk.

Following his first pre-season in England, Duku opted to join Chesham United over Oxford and went onto only appear four times for the Buckinghamshire-based side before making the switch to Hemel Hempstead Town. After just a sole appearance in an FA Trophy tie against Eastbourne Borough, Duku went onto enjoy spells with Kings Langley and Banbury United before joining Southern League side Hayes & Yeading United prior to the 2017–18 campaign.

On 26 July 2018, Duku agreed to deal to join League Two side Cheltenham Town on a two-year deal. On the opening day of the 2018–19 campaign, he went onto make his Football League debut during Cheltenham's 1–0 home defeat to Crawley Town. Duku joined Barnet on loan in October 2018 until the end of the calendar year.

In February 2019 he joined FC Halifax Town on loan for a month.  On 12 June 2019 it was announced that Duku will join National League club Torquay United. On 9 December 2019, it was announced his contract was cancelled by mutual consent so he could return to the Netherlands with his young family. Later in an interview with Dutch website "Voetbalzone", the player contradicted this, saying this was only a statement of the club, not himself. Early the following year, Duku re-joined Hayes & Yeading on 1 January 2020.

On 3 August 2020, Duku signed a one year contract with Scottish Championship club Raith Rovers.

On 16 June 2021, Duku signed for fellow Scottish club Inverness Caledonian Thistle on a one-year deal. He left the club by mutual agreement in January 2022.

On 3 February 2022, Duku signed for National League South side Havant & Waterlooville. He left the club at the end of the season.

In July 2022, Duku joined newly promoted, York City in the National League. He scored his first goal for the club on his debut in a friendly against Middlesbrough.

Personal life
Born in the Netherlands, Duku is of Ghanaian descent.

Career statistics

References

External links

1992 births
Living people
Footballers from Amsterdam
Dutch sportspeople of Ghanaian descent
Dutch footballers
Dutch expatriate footballers
Association football forwards
Chesham United F.C. players
Hemel Hempstead Town F.C. players
Kings Langley F.C. players
Banbury United F.C. players
Hayes & Yeading United F.C. players
Cheltenham Town F.C. players
Barnet F.C. players
FC Halifax Town players
Torquay United F.C. players
English Football League players
National League (English football) players
Southern Football League players
Expatriate footballers in England
Raith Rovers F.C. players
Scottish Professional Football League players
Inverness Caledonian Thistle F.C. players
Havant & Waterlooville F.C. players
York City F.C. players